Marlion Pickett (born 6 January 1992) is a professional Australian rules footballer playing for the Richmond Football Club in the Australian Football League (AFL). He won the Norm Goss Memorial Medal as best on ground during Richmond's reserves side's premiership in 2019 before making his debut in a victorious AFL grand final the following week. Pickett was the first player to debut in a VFL/AFL grand final in 67 years and the first to win a premiership in his debut game since 1926. He became a two-time premiership winner with Richmond's grand final victory in 2020, earning the second honour in just his 20th game at AFL level.

Early life, junior football and criminal sentences
Pickett was born in Perth in January 1992 to parents Thomas Pickett and Angela Smith. The third of seven children, Pickett spent his early childhood in the northern suburbs of Perth. He was raised in difficult circumstances, witnessing family violence and drug and alcohol abuse within his immediate and extended family, while experiencing food insecurity due to his parents being out of work and supported entirely by welfare.

Pickett first played football at age seven, playing alongside his older brother in the under 9s division at the Puma Panthers in Balga. At age 11, Pickett's family relocated to the south-west regional Western Australian town of Manjimup, where he played junior football for the Manjimup Tigers, including in a Colts premiership for the side at just 14 years of age. He returned to Perth at age 15 in 2007, settling in Eden Hill in the city's north. While there, he played football with the Nollamora Junior Football Club and senior amateur Indigenous club, Koongamia. He experienced racial abuse at the hands of teammates while at Nollamora and sat out a junior grand final in protest of his club's failure to act on the issue, before departing the club entirely.

Later in 2007, Pickett was involved in a brawl alongside family members in the northern suburb of Bassendean and was subsequently charged with committing grievous bodily harm. While on bail for that charge, Pickett was arrested for engaging in a subsequent brawl and charged with both robbery and assault. He was eventually convicted for both the grievously bodily harm and robbery charges and served a six month juvenile detention sentence at Rangeview Remand Centre in Murdoch.

Pickett left school at age 16 and soon after his release from juvenile detention he moved away from his parents and into his partners' family home in Hamilton Hill. He resumed football with Koongamia, but was unable to find work, instead being charged with more criminal offences including driving without a licence and burglary. As a bail condition for failing to appear in court for the latter charge, Pickett resumed living with his parents, who had relocated east of Perth to the town of York. At age 17, he played seniors for the York Roos in the Avon Football Association and later that year he was charged with assault and reckless driving that year for his part in a public fight between feuding families, though those charges were later dropped. Picket moved homes more than a dozen times over the next year, still unable to find work, before becoming an ice user and dealer not long after his 18th birthday. He soon began burglarising local cars to fund the habit, before he and a group of friends conducted two major early-morning burglaries by smashing into local shopping centres with sledgehammers on back-to-back weekends. Pickett was subsequently charged and found guilty of 17 counts of burglary and one count of aggravated burglary. He was sentenced to one year imprisonment for each count of burglary (each served concurrently) and 18 months for the aggravatedly burglary, for a total of two and half years imprisonment.

Pickett served the first portion of his sentence at Acacia Prison in Wooroloo, where he suffered from serious mental health episodes and attempted suicide on four occasions. After being transferred to the lower security Wooroloo Prison Farm, Pickett was the star member of the prison's travelling amateur football team, a program covered by the ABC's 2014 documentary television series, Outside Chance. He struggled with the low structure environment of the prison farm however, subsequently staging a drugs infraction to force a move to the main prison campus for the remainder of his sentence.

State-league football
Pickett was released from jail at age 21 in June 2013, after serving the full 30 months of his sentence. He immediately took up an offer to train with West Australian Football League (WAFL) club South Fremantle at the insistence of his elder brother Tommy, who had been a reserves player there in 2012. He was signed to the club's list almost immediately and played his first reserves grade game in late June 2013, two weeks after his release, where he recorded 15 disposals and two goals. Within two months he was called up for a senior WAFL debut, kicking three goals and recording nine marks, 26 disposals and eight inside 50s in a late-August match against East Perth. Pickett spent the remainder of the season playing on the wing and at half-forward and was a member of the club's reserves-grade premiership victory that season after the senior side failed to qualify for finals.

Pickett was a senior player by round 1, 2014, but finished the year in the reserves side after a form slump in the middle of the year cause by opposition tagging and a later positional shift to the forward line. In 2015, he was moved to the half back line and was rewarded with selection in the WAFL/Western Australia representative team and also finished third in South Fremantle's best and fairest award. During that season, Pickett was charged with grievous bodily harm after engaging in a fight with a racially abusive attendee at a friends party, though those charges were later dropped just before they were due to be heard in November 2016. On-field in 2016, he was again selected in the state team and finished second in South Fremantle's best and fairest count.

Pickett played in all but two matches in South Fremantle's 2017 home and away season, before contributing to the clubs preliminary finals run. In 2018, he moved into a midfield role following the departure of recently AFL-drafted teammate Tim Kelly. He was regularly named by The West Australian as among South Fremantle's best players in matches that year and finished the season having won the club's best and fairest award and being named to the WAFL Team of the Year while averaging 21.8 disposals per game. He contributed a stand-out performance in that season's finals series, recording four goals and 26 disposals in a qualifying final against  and 25 disposals and two goals in a semi-final against . 

As part of that interest, he was interviewed extensively by Gold Coast and was flown out to tour the club's facilities and meet head coach Stuart Dew in person. Pickett was ultimately passed over by all AFL clubs in both the national and rookie drafts that year.

Prior to the start of the 2019 WAFL season, Pickett was labelled the competition's fourth best player by The West Australian. He failed to play a match in the early part of the season however, after suffering a broken finger in a practice match one week before round 1. He made a return to play that same month, but suffered a re-break of the same finger in his second game back and just days before the mid-season draft. Pickett underwent emergency surgery on the night of the injury, with Essendon telling his management they were no longer interested in drafting him mid-season. 

He had played 98 games and kicked 37 goals for South Fremantle over six and a half seasons in the WAFL.

AFL career

2019 season

Pickett participated in aerobic conditioning work throughout the first three weeks of his injury rehabilitation, joining the club's rehab group under the guidance of injured captain Trent Cotchin. He began full contact training in the last week of July and made a reserves-grade debut for Richmond's VFL side in the first weekend of August, kicking one goal and recording 20 disposals. Pickett was named an AFL-level emergency in each of the following two weeks, but ultimately played each week in the reserves in a dual role as a midfielder and half-back. Pickett was named as an AFL emergency the following week for the qualifying final against Brisbane, before contributing 16 disposals and seven tackles in a VFL preliminary final win over Port Melbourne. 

He again missed out on AFL selection in the club's top-league preliminary final against Geelong a week later, but did play in the VFL grand final that same weekend against Williamstown. In what earned the club its first reserves premiership since 1997, Pickett recorded 19 disposals, nine tackles and a goal in a best-on-ground performance that saw him awarded the Norm Goss Memorial Medal.

AFL Grand Final

In the week that followed, Pickett burst into AFL selection consideration as a potential replacement for injured midfielder Jack Graham, the leading goal kicker in the 2017 Grand Final. When Graham was officially ruled out, Pickett was called up to make his debut in the 2019 AFL Grand Final against Greater Western Sydney, becoming just the sixth player and the first since Keith Batchelor for Collingwood in 1952 to make his first-team debut in a VFL or AFL Grand Final. When he helped to his side to a 89-point victory in that Grand Final, Pickett also became the first player to win a premiership in his debut game since Francis Vine with Melbourne in 1926. He was among the best players on the ground in the win, finishing third in the Norm Smith Medal voting with four votes (two from Angela Pippos and one each from Bruce McAvaney and Matthew Lloyd) behind teammates Bachar Houli and unanimous winner Dustin Martin, after a performance which included 22 disposals and his debut AFL goal off a set shot with 12 minutes played in the third quarter. Pickett's season at Richmond concluded after one AFL match and six in the VFL, with premierships at both the top-flight and reserves-grade levels.

Pickett was also later profiled in Australian Story following the Grand Final. He also revealed that his pointing to the sky after his maiden goal in the Grand Final was dedicating the goal to loved ones who had died before his successful debut, saying, "I don’t really celebrate goals much...I pointed to the sky, that was for the hard times, and the family me and Jess have lost along the journey. The celebration was for them." Just over a month before the Grand Final, Pickett had flown back to Perth for the funeral of Sam Nannup – his friend and former cellmate and also the brother of his partner Jessica – who had committed suicide just a few weeks after his own release from prison and who had told Pickett that he would come to watch his first AFL game.

2020 season
In the 2019/20 off-season, Pickett was awarded Richmond life membership for playing in the club's 2019 premiership-winning team. He completed a full load of pre-season training and maintained a place in the club's best 22 through each of its two pre-season series matches, before earning selection in the season-opening match against Carlton. Pickett recorded 14 disposals and an equal match-high five tackles in the win, played under extraordinary conditions imposed on the league as a result of the rapid progression of the coronavirus pandemic into Australia. In what the league planned would be the first of a reduced 17-round season, the match was played without crowds in attendance due to public health prohibitions on large gatherings and with quarter lengths reduced by one fifth in order to reduce the physical load on players who would be expected to play multiple matches with short breaks in the second half of the year. Just three days later, the AFL Commission suspended the season for an indefinite period after multiple states enforced quarantine conditions on their borders that effectively ruled out the possibility of continuing the season as planned. Pickett contributed just seven disposals in a round 2 draw with  when the season resumed in early-June following an 11-week hiatus. He was again subdued with 10 disposals in round 3, before being omitted from the club's round 4 side. Instead, he took part in an unofficial scratch match against 's reserves players due to the cancellation of the VFL season. He played one further reserves match the following week before the main playing group was relocated to the Gold Coast in response to a virus outbreak in Melbourne. He was praised by coach Damien Hardwick for his defensive efforts in a semi-final win over  a week later, before improving his offensive game with 13 deposals in a preliminary final against  in the third week of the finals. One week later, Pickett became a two-time AFL premiership player in just his 20th appearance, as Richmond defeated  at the Gabba to claim a second successive premiership. He contributed 14 disposals in the win and was praised by AFL Media for his dedication to push back from the wing into defensive 50 to assist his teammates' defensive efforts. He finished the season having played 19 of a possible 21 games, placing 18th in the club's best and fairest count.

In mid November, Pickett signed a 2 year extension to stay at Tigerland until 2022.

Player profile
Pickett plays as a wing and occasionally as an inside midfielder, but previously also played as a half-back during a long state-league career. In his debut game he played as an inside midfielder and half-forward, but Pickett has played as a dedicated winger since the beginning of the 2020 season. He has a combination skill set that makes him good at winning contested possessions inside stoppage contests but with the speed and poise for ball carrying in uncontested contests, as well as a strong vertical leap.

AFL statistics
Updated to the end of round 23, 2022.

|-
| scope=row bgcolor=F0E68C | 2019#
|style="text-align:center;"|
| 50 || 1 || 1 || 0 || 13 || 9 || 22 || 2 || 1 || 1.0 || 0.0 || 13.0 || 9.0 || 22.0 || 2.0 || 1.0
|-
| scope=row bgcolor=F0E68C | 2020#
|style="text-align:center;"|
| 50 || 19 || 4 || 4 || 119 || 113 || 232 || 43 || 69 || 0.2 || 0.2 || 6.3 || 5.9 || 12.2 || 2.3 || 3.6
|-
| 2021
|style="text-align:center;"|
| 50 || 18 || 2 || 4 || 119 || 163 || 282 || 63 || 62 || 0.1 || 0.2 || 6.6 || 9.1 || 15.7 || 3.5 || 3.4
|-
| 2022
|style="text-align:center;"|
| 50 || 18 || 8 || 5 || 165 || 117 || 282 || 81 || 50 || 0.4 || 0.3 || 9.2 || 6.5 || 15.7 || 4.5 || 2.8
|- scope="row" style="background-color: #EAEAEA; font-weight:bold; text-align: center; width:2em" class="sortbottom"
| colspan=3| Career
| 56
| 15
| 13
| 416
| 402
| 818
| 189
| 182
| 0.3
| 0.2
| 7.4
| 7.2
| 14.6
| 3.4
| 3.3
|}

Notes

Honours and achievements
AFL
 2x AFL premiership player: 2019, 2020

 Richmond Football Club life member 2020.

VFL
 VFL premiership player: 2019
Norm Goss Memorial Medal: 2019

WAFL
South Fremantle best & fairest: 2018
Western Australia state-league game representative: 2015, 2016

Personal life
Pickett is a Noongar Aboriginal Australian man.

His father is cousin to former ,  and  player Byron Pickett.

Pickett was convicted of grievous bodily harm and spent time in youth detention as a 15 year old. He was also imprisoned between 2010 and 2013 for multiple criminal offences including burglary. Though he was never charged, Pickett has admitted to being a regular ice user as a young adult, in addition to working as a dealer over the same period.

He has four children with partner Jess Nannup, who he met and began dating at age 16.

References

External links

 
 
 
 Marlion Pickett's WAFL playing statistics

1992 births
Living people
VFL/AFL Players who played their first game in a Grand Final
Richmond Football Club players
Richmond Football Club Premiership players
South Fremantle Football Club players
Australian rules footballers from Western Australia
Indigenous Australian players of Australian rules football
Noongar people
Two-time VFL/AFL Premiership players